Football was introduced to the Ottoman Empire by Englishmen living in the area. The first matches took place in Selanik, now known as Thessaloniki, in 1875. F.C. Smyrna was the first football club established in Turkey. The same men brought football from İzmir to Istanbul in 1895. The first competitive matches between İzmir and Istanbul clubs took place in 1897, 1898, 1899, and 1904. The İzmir team won every match.

Early years (1875–1958)

The first Turkish man to play the sport was a soldier on assignment in İzmir in 1898. The first teams in the Ottoman Empire consisted of Greek, Armenian and English players.

The first club made up of Turkish footballers was Black Stockings FC, in 1899. Police of the Ottoman Empire invaded the pitch, arresting as many players as they could catch. Cadi Keuy FRC, Moda FC, Elpis, and Imogene FC followed the precedent set by Black Stockings. The first competitive league was created in 1904. Based in Istanbul and titled the "Constantinople Football League", it consisted the four aforementioned clubs (Cadi Keuy FRC, Moda FC, Elpis, and Imogene FC). However, Turkish players were still prohibited to compete. In the following years, clubs such as Fenerbahçe and Galatasaray (Still-active Turkish club with the oldest football team. Despite Beşiktaş was founded in 1903, they started football activities in 1911)  were founded with Turkish players. The league was also known as the Sunday League because the matches took place on Sunday.

Two teams from the Ottoman Empire competed in football at the 1906 Intercalated Games: Smyrna and Thessaloniki. Both clubs lost heavily to Denmark and Athens, losing 5-1 and 5-0 respectively. However, Athens withdrew from the second place match, allowing Smyrna to compete against Thessaloniki. Smyrna won 3–0, winning the silver medal. Another league was created in Istanbul in 1912. The league was called The Friday League, and the clubs played their matches on Friday. The league was made up of Darülfünun S.K., İstanbul J.K. (later known as Türk İdman Ocağı, who became Trabzonspor in 1967), Anadolu S.K., Sanayii F.K., Şehremini S.K., and Fenerbahçe S.K. (II). The Sunday League remained the dominant league until the 1915–16 season, when both leagues merged.

The İstanbul Türk İdman Birliği was created by Beşiktaş in 1919. The league was not allowed to join the Friday League. Later on, in 1922, the Türkiye İdman Cemiyetleri İttifakı was founded. The league was made up of clubs from various cities throughout Turkey. The league helped create the Turkish Football Federation on 23 April 1923 as Futbol Hey'et-i Müttehidesi. In the same year the Turkey national football team played its first ever international match against Romania. Leagues were being created in other cities such as Adana, Ankara, Eskişehir, İzmir, and Trabzon. The Milli Küme was created in 1937 as a competition between the top clubs from Ankara, Istanbul, and İzmir. The competition lasted until 1950. The first professional leagues were established in 1952 in the big three cities. The first national professional league was created in 1959, known as the Milli Lig. After the creation of the second and third divisions, professional leagues outside of the national league became amateur competitions.

The Milli Lig (National league) was first held in 1959 with clubs from Ankara, Istanbul, and Izmir. Qualification took place in 1958 to decide who would take part in the sixteen club, two group league. Fenerbahçe were the champions of the first Milli Lig, with Metin Oktay of Galatasaray finishing top scorer.

References